Chuck Leonowicz (January 16, 1958 – September 9, 2000) was an American bobsledder. He competed in the four man event at the 1992 Winter Olympics.

References

External links
 

1958 births
2000 deaths
American male bobsledders
Olympic bobsledders of the United States
Bobsledders at the 1992 Winter Olympics
Sportspeople from Schenectady, New York